Leopold is an unincorporated community in Doddridge County, West Virginia, United States. Its post office is closed.

Leopold Hinter, an early postmaster, gave the community his name.

References 

Unincorporated communities in West Virginia
Unincorporated communities in Doddridge County, West Virginia